The Art of Love may refer to:

 The Art of Love (Ovid) (Ars Amatoria), a 2 AD poem by Ovid
 The Art of Love (1965 film), an American comedy starring Dick Van Dyke and James Garner
 The Art of Love (2011 film), a French comedy by Emmanuel Mouret
 The Art of Love (album), a 2007 album by Sandra
 Art of Love (Art Supawatt Purdy album), a 2003 Warner Music CD by Thai-American singer Art Supawatt Purdy
 Art of Love: Music of Machaut, a 2009 album by Robert Sadin
 "Art of Love" (song), a 2009 song by Guy Sebastian
 "The Art of Love", a 1965 song by Eartha Kitt
 Art of Love, a 2001 short film featuring Erin Sanders
 An alternative title for the 1928 German film Princess Olala
 Art of Love (film), a 2022 romantic thriller film

See also 
 The Art of Loving, a 1956 book by Erich Fromm